Satellite Sam is a creator-owned American comic book series by Matt Fraction and American artist Howard Chaykin distributed by Image Comics starting in July 2013.

Plot 
Carlyle White, a children's television show presenter in the 1950s, is found dead with a box of photographs of scantily clad women in provocative positions. His son believes the box of photographs is the key to solving his father's murder. The story follows Carlyle's son, a recovering alcoholic, as he steps into his father's shoes as the television character Satellite Sam, deals with his addictions, and wrangles producers, writers, and journalists during the nascent days of television.

Collected editions

References

Comics by Howard Chaykin
Comics by Matt Fraction
Crime comics
Image Comics titles